Nagrota may refer to:

Places 
 Nagrota, a town in the Jammu district of Jammu and Kashmir, India
 Nagrota, Jammu and Kashmir Assembly constituency, a legislative assembly constituency named after Nagrota, Jammu
 Nagrota Bagwan, a town in the Kangra district of Himachal Pradesh, India
 Nagrota (Himachal Pradesh Assembly constituency), a legislative assembly constituency named after Nagrota Bagwan
 Nagarota Surian, a town in the Kangra district of Himachal Pradesh, India

Events 
 Nagrota army base attack, a terrorist attack at Nagrota, Jammu district